George Edgar Merrick (June 3, 1886 – March 26, 1942) was a real estate developer who is best known as the planner and builder of the city of Coral Gables, Florida in the 1920s, one of the first major planned communities in the United States.

Family background and youth
Merrick was born in the Pittsburgh suburb of Springdale, Pennsylvania. His father Solomon G. Merrick was a Congregationalist minister. The family moved to Miami, Florida from Duxbury, Massachusetts in 1898  when George was 12 years old. He attended Rollins College in Winter Park. Upon graduation, Merrick moved to New York to study law until 1911 when his father's death prompted him to return to Miami.

Career
In October, 1915, Merrick was appointed by the governor of Florida to replace F.A. Bryant as the county commissioner in District 1. He spent the next 15 months on the commission championing the building of roads in south Florida, including major arteries that would later serve to connect his well-planned community of Coral Gables, Florida with the fast-growing city of Miami. Along with Commissioner Edward DeVere Burr of Arch Creek, the two men ushered the vast majority of all road construction projects in Dade County, including the construction of South Dixie Highway (US 1), the Tamiami Trail across the Everglades, the County Causeway to Miami Beach, Ingraham Highway (later known as Old Cutler Road) along the coast, the Miami Canal Highway and many others. These improvements allowed the population of Greater Miami to quadruple from 1915 to 1921, transforming a pioneer territory into a burgeoning metropolis.

Coral Gables
Beginning in 1922, on 3,000 acres (12 km²) of citrus groves and land covered in pine trees which his father had left him, Merrick began carving out a town along the lines of the City Beautiful movement. He designed the new town in great detail, featuring wide, tree-lined boulevards, delicate bridges and sedate urban golf courses. Merrick's secret was his passionate devotion to aesthetics. He wanted to focus on the finest details of this town not just on the major ideas behind the project.  As a result, his team included men of diverse background, such as Denman Fink, an artist, H. George Fink and Phineas Paist, both architects, and Frank Button, a landscape artist. Another important aspect of the planning that was very important to Merrick was zoning divisions. Merrick wanted areas of the community to be set aside as commercial, residential or recreational and he wanted the divisions to be clear.

In three years, Merrick spent over $20 million to build a thousand Mediterranean style houses, which complemented the Biltmore Hotel, the country clubs, and the other community buildings that Merrick had also designed and overseen the construction of.

In a 1925 interview with the New York Times, Merrick commented: "Just how I came to utilize the Spanish type of architecture in Coral Gables, I can hardly say, except that it always seemed to me to be the only way houses should be built down there in those tropical surroundings." 

Once he was done building the core of Coral Gables, Merrick decided to branch out creatively. Many people who did not like the Mediterranean Revival Style rejected Coral Gables because its lack of variety. Merrick therefore decided to design small communities, or villages, within Coral Gables with different international influences.

The following year, just weeks before the start of the inaugural school year, a devastating hurricane on September 17–18, 1926, followed by the Great Depression, ended Merrick's dreams of further developing Coral Gables.

With time, Merrick fell into heavy debt and by 1928 he was asked to leave the Coral Gables Commission. At this point, he left Coral Gables and moved to Upper Matecumbe Key, where he opened his Caribee Club, not far from the famous Long Key Fishing Camp, on nearby Long Key, an upscale fishing resort, with his wife. Merrick returned to Gables only when he became the postmaster for the county, two years before his death. The monstrous Labor Day Hurricane of 1935, called the "Storm of the Century", destroyed almost everything on the Middle Keys, including Merrick's Caribee Club, which was never rebuilt.

George Merrick's former home in Coral Gables, Coral Gables House, is maintained as a historic house museum. The Solomon G. Merrick Building at the University of Miami at Coral Gables was built in honor of Merrick's father, who was a Congregational minister and abolitionist.

Poetry 
In 1920, Merrick published a book of poetry titled, "Songs of the Wind on a Southern Shore, and other Poems of Florida," with The Four Seas Publishing Company.

Controversy 
In May 2021, the University of Miami announced the parking structure on Merrick Drive would no longer be referred to by George Merrick's name, but that the Solomon G. Merrick Building named in honor of George Merrick’s father would remain, and "as for the roadway, the renaming of George E. Merrick Street goes beyond the purview of the Board of Trustees." The university's decision was a response to a petition created by alumni and students in the wake of Black Lives Matter protests, titled "Rename University of Miami facilities with a racist history." The petition alleged George Merrick "boldly held and acted upon, racist segregationist beliefs throughout his life." The petition did not to mention that George Merrick faced criticism from the white community, when he let the black community's housing cross over the Color line (racism), which violated the segregationist laws of the time. The petition did mention Merrick looked up to his father, but did not mention that his father, Solomon G. Merrick, was an abolitionist, and a reverend with one of the first American Protestant denominations to take a strong stand against slavery in the 1850's, nor did it state that George Merrick lived in a society where segregation was legally required because of Jim Crow laws, laws which predated his birth (b.1886) and superseded his death (d.1942).

In the early to mid-twentieth century, government sought to improve living conditions and public health and safety through Slum clearance in the United States, as seen with the Federal Housing Act of 1937, which defined a slum as "any area where dwellings predominate which by reason of dilapidation, over-crowding, faulty arrangement or design, lack of ventilation, light or sanitation facilities, or any combination of these factors, are detrimental to safety, health, or morals." This was relevant to Merrick who as a boy experienced a yellow fever epidemic and forced quarantine when he was moving to South Florida. In 1937, Merrick's proposed "Negro Resettlement Plan," as part of the slum clearance laws promulgated under President Franklin D. Roosevelt, would have relocated Black residents to new locations outside of their current segregated housing in Miami, but the resettlement plan was never implemented. Merrick recognized and lamented that the living conditions for the black community were unfair, and he advocated for the black community's access to water and "water use," their ability to grow and access their own fresh food from their own property, and their right to larger and beautiful homes. When beachfront land was being bought up, Merrick argued that everyone should have the right to beach access, which included middle to lower income whites and the Black community; because of the Jim Crow laws, beaches were segregated, but Merrick believed that rather than deny the Black community complete beach access, that they should have their own "great Bay beach" and park, and that it should be forever preserved for the Black community.

In his 1937 speech to the Miami Realty Board, Merrick lamented the unfair living conditions of the black community, he recalled peddling vegetables when he was young and stated "[i]f I had anything in the wagon left over, I would go over into negro town and get rid of it. Sadly, but truly, that is the picture of how we have always treated our negro population. If anything is left over, or anything we do not want, then the negroes get that. Today one third of our present population is negro. When we will have a million people, we will have at least a fourth of a million negroes. Today this third of our present citizenry are effectively denied water access and “water use.” Now collectively, as well as individually, we cannot receive fairness, unless we give fairness. It is proposed—for Miami at least, that this unfair condition be remedied. It is proposed to give fairness to this deserving one third of our citizenry. It is proposed that at a proper point on this proposed fifty mile water Loop, that a great Bay beach be established and forever preserved for negro use. And that similarly, on the ocean side of the Loop that similar advantages be established and preferably in one whole little island facing on the Gulf Stream, which could ideally be made there for them an ocean and Gulf Stream park."

The petition to remove Merrick's name from the University of Miami campus, claimed that "leading up to public votes on George Merrick’s aforementioned, “Slum Clearance Plan,” [from 1937] the use of racist advertisement materials was fairly wide-spread throughout Miami and the surrounding areas," the petition then cited an image of a slum clearance ad from the 1950s (years after the death of George Merrick), the image used was not from George Merrick's lifetime.

Published as part of Vizcaya Museum and Gardens "Black Voices," Dr. Dorothy Fields, historian and founder of The Black Archives, noted the significance of Merrick's admiration of the Bahamian community's impact and inspiration. Merrick wrote a series of stories he titled “Men of the Magical Isles,” honoring the Bahamian laborers he worked with. When "Nellie Powers, a Black woman in the community, decided to open a private school to educate Black children, Merrick, along with a biracial board, donated to the cause, up until that point “Miami had never seen such an inter-racial effort.”" Merrick also purchased land to give to the Bahamian laborers to live on, which became the MacFarlane District.

The only structure on the University of Miami campus named after George Merrick, is the "Merrick Garage," which the university and students, also refer to as the "Brown Garage." The Solomon G. Merrick Building, named after George Merrick's father is sometimes referred to as the "Merrick Building." As of June 2022, the University of Miami has maintained the name of the "Merrick Garage" on all directional signs and maps.

Personal life 
On February 5, 1916, Merrick married Eunice Isabella Peacock, daughter of Coconut Grove pioneers, R.A.S. Peacock and Lilian Irene Frow. Merrick built a home for his bride, called Poinciana Place, located at 937 Coral Way, in Coral Gables.

Legacy and honors
In 1927, Merrick was awarded the Order of Isabella the Catholic by King Alfonso XII of Spain for his support of Spanish culture in Coral Gables.
A year after Merrick's death, in 1943, the World War II Liberty Ship  was named in his honor.
In 2006, the Coral Gables Garden Club commissioned a statue of George Merrick to be placed in front of City Hall. The bronze statue was crafted by American sculptor, William Beckwith.  Architect Rocco Ceo designed the pedestal for the statue and surrounding bench, which were constructed from coral rock.
On June 3, 2021, the City of Coral Gables celebrated its inaugural "Founder's Day Ceremony" at City Hall, marking the 135th anniversary of George Merrick's birthday to commemorate his legacy.
The cover of the July 2021 edition of Coral Gables Magazine features a watercolor painting honoring Merrick by artist Carlos Garcia-Barbon; the painting depicts the bronze George Merrick statue in front of City Hall. 
In 2022, the City of Coral Gables enacted a resolution recognizing June 3rd as "Founder's Day in Coral Gables" honoring Merrick on the anniversary of his birthday.

In popular culture
Merrick appears as a major supporting character in the 2014 point and click adventure A Golden Wake.

References
Notes

Bibliography

 Ashley, Kathryne, George E. Merrick and Coral Gables (Cristal Bay Publishers, 1985).
 "Minutes of the Dade County Commission 1915-1917" (Clerk of the Dade County Commission).
 David Nolan, Fifty Feet in Paradise:  The Booming of Florida.  (Harcourt Brace Jovanovich, 1984).
 Florida Editors Association, The Book of Florida (No place); James O. Jones, 1925
 Parks, Arva Moore, George Merrick, Son of the South Wind: Visionary Creator of Coral Gables, University Press of Florida, 2015. .

External links
 University of Miami History
 Circa The Beaches - Full Image Library George Merrick Villages
 "When the groves begin to bear..."
 Lillian Frow Peacock & Eunice Peacock Merrick Digital Collection at University of Miami Libraries

1886 births
1942 deaths
People from Springdale, Pennsylvania
County commissioners in Florida
History of racism in Florida
People from Coral Gables, Florida
American city founders
Florida postmasters
20th-century American politicians
Rollins College alumni